The Hopkinton Supply Co. Building is a historic commercial building at 26-28 Main Street in Hopkinton, Massachusetts.  The single-story pressed metal building was built in 1906, and is a locally unusual example of a mail-order commercial storefront.  The storefront was manufactured by the George L. Mesker Company of Evansville, Indiana.  It was first occupied by William Morse's Hopkinton Supply Company, and housed a branch of The Great Atlantic & Pacific Tea Company from 1928 to 1954.

The building was listed on the National Register of Historic Places in 1983.

See also
National Register of Historic Places listings in Middlesex County, Massachusetts

References

Commercial buildings on the National Register of Historic Places in Massachusetts
Buildings and structures in Middlesex County, Massachusetts
Retail buildings in Massachusetts
National Register of Historic Places in Middlesex County, Massachusetts
Hopkinton, Massachusetts